Brachioxena sparactis is a species of moth of the family Tortricidae. It is found in the Democratic Republic of Congo and Uganda.

References

Moths described in 1928
Eucosmini